The Verzocchi collection or the Galleria Verzocchi - work in contemporary painting is a collection of over seventy 20th-century Italian paintings formed by the entrepreneur Giuseppe Verzocchi from 1949 to 1950.  It contains only paintings of 90 by 70 cm and only on the themes of work and self-portraiture. Each painting is marked "V & D", the Verzocchi brand. It now forms part of the Pinacoteca civica di Forlì.

Artists and works

 Afro, Tenaglia e camera oscura
 Amerigo Bartoli Natinguerra, L'impiegato
 Luigi Bartolini, Le mietitrici
 Aldo Bergamini, Pittrice di ceramiche
 Ugo Bernasconi, Vangatori
 Renato Birolli, Il porto di Nantes
 Marcello Boccacci, La stiratrice
 Leonardo Borgese, Indossatrici
 Pompeo Borra, Compagni di lavoro
 Giovanni Brancaccio, Pescatori di fondo
 Gastone Breddo, Il ciabattino
 Anselmo Bucci, Il ponte sul Metauro
 Guido Cadorin, Pittori di barche
 Corrado Cagli, Il vasaio
 Massimo Campigli, L'architrave
 Domenico Cantatore, Cucitrice
 Giuseppe Capogrossi, Lavoro
 Felice Carena, Lo scultore
 Aldo Carpi, Studio del pittore
 Carlo Carrà, Costruttori
 Felice Casorati, Mani, oggetti, testa...
 Bruno Cassinari, Pescatori del porto di Antibes
 Primo Conti, Giardiniere
 Antonio Corpora, I lavoratori del mare
 Giorgio de Chirico, Forgia di Vulcano
 Raffaele De Grada, Massaie al lavoro
 Fortunato Depero, Tornio e telaio
 Filippo De Pisis, Piccolo fabbro
 Francesco De Rocchi, Semina di primavera
 Antonio Donghi, Carico di fascine
 Cesare Fratino, La pressa idraulica
 Achille Funi, Lo scultore
 Bepi Galletti, Allieve di pittura
 Luciano Gaspari, Merlettaia di Burano
 Romano Gazzera, I pionieri
 Virgilio Guidi, Il lavoro del metallo
 Renato Guttuso, Bracciante siciliano
 Mino Maccari, Scuola di pittura
 Mario Mafai, Gli scaricatori di carbone
 Concetto Maugeri, Ricostruzione
 Francesco Menzio, Nello studio
 Giuseppe Migneco, Contadino che zappa
 Cesare Monti, Ai campi
 Enzo Morelli, La strada nuova
 Mattia Moreni, La fucina
 Ennio Morlotti, Riparatrici di reti
 Marco Novati, "El remer" (Il fabbricante di remi)
 Giuseppe Novello, Ricamatrice
 Cipriano Efisio Oppo, La fiorista
 Carlo Parmeggiani, Il santo lavoro
 Fausto Pirandello, I vangatori
 Armando Pizzinato, I costruttori di forni
 Enrico Prampolini, Il lavoro del tempo (Ritmi geologici)
 Ottone Rosai, I muratori
 Bruno Saetti, La mondina
 Alberto Salietti, La vendemmia
 Aldo Salvadori, La modella
 Giuseppe Santomaso, Piccola vetreria
 Aligi Sassu, Il campo arato
 Pio Semeghini, Piccola merlettaia
 Gino Severini, Simboli del lavoro
 Mario Sironi, Il lavoro
 Ardengo Soffici, La vangatura
 Orfeo Tamburi, La fornace
 Fiorenzo Tomea, Il raccolto dell'orzo
 Arturo Tosi, Terre arate
 Giulio Turcato, Gli scaricatori
 Gianni Vagnetti, Il lavoro del pittore
 Italo Valenti, Le locomotive
 Emilio Vedova, Interno di fabbrica
 Mario Vellani Marchi, Piccole merlettaie buranelle
 Umberto Vittorini, Donna che lavora

External links
 Deeper article
Time Magazine Article

Art museums and galleries in Emilia-Romagna
Forlì
Former private collections in Italy